Luisa de' Medici (25 December 1476 – 1488) was an Italian noble. She was the daughter of Lorenzo de' Medici and Clarice Orsini. She was going to marry with her fiancé Giovanni di Pierfrancesco de' Medici, but she died in 1488 at the age of 11.

Ancestry

References

1476 births
1488 deaths
House of Medici
Royalty and nobility who died as children